Albert Česká republika, s.r.o., is a division of the Netherlands-based Ahold Delhaize group, operating in the Czech Republic. The company (then known as Euronova a.s.) began trading in Czechoslovakia in 1990. Today it operates the approximately 330 outlets forming the supermarket chain Albert.

History
The company opened its first store in 1991, under the brand name Mana. This outlet, in Jihlava, was Czechoslovakia's first supermarket.

In 2005, Ahold took over 56 outlets of the Austrian-based Julius Meinl supermarket when the latter company left the Czech market, and remodelled them to conform to their Albert brand. In 2009, the company dropped the Hypernova brand, re-branding all hypermarket operations to the name Albert Hypermarket.

In March 2014 Ahold Czech Republic a.s. acquired 35 hypermarkets and 14 supermarkets from Spar for more than 5.2 billion Czech koruna. With this move Albert became and remains the Czech Republic's biggest supermarket chain in terms of outlets, with some 330 stores. The Prague TV guide mentioned in 2015 both the original pioneering and current outdatedness of the Albert stores.

References

Ahold Delhaize
Retail companies established in 1991
Supermarkets of the Czech Republic
Organizations based in Prague